Samoylenko is a rural locality (a khutor) in Skororybskoye Rural Settlement, Podgorensky District, Voronezh Oblast, Russia. The population was 52 as of 2010. There are 3 streets.

Geography 
Samoylenko is located 12 km west of Podgorensky (the district's administrative centre) by road. Bolshoy Skororyb is the nearest rural locality.

References 

Rural localities in Podgorensky District